Abu Ishaq Inju was the last Injuid ruler from 1343 to 1357. During his reign the city of Shiraz flourished, consisting of prominent figures such as Hafez, Khwaju Kermani and Ubayd Zakani. In 1357, the Muzaffarid ruler Mubariz al-Din Muhammad captured Shiraz, and had Abu Ishaq Inju executed.

In Shiraz, Abu Ishaq reportedly had a building constructed that reflected the Sasanian palace Taq-e Kasra at Ctesiphon. However, the construction was never finished and no remains of the building stand today.

References

Sources 
 
  

 

14th-century monarchs in the Middle East
1358 deaths
Injuids
14th-century Iranian people